Democratic Republic of the Congo competed in the 2003 All-Africa Games held at the National Stadium in the city of Abuja, Nigeria. The country sent 86 athletes to compete, including teams to compete in basketball and handball. The team won two medals, including a silver in women's basketball.

Competitors
The Democratic Republic of the Congo took the Games as, in the words of Youth, Sports and Leisure Minister , "an opportunity to strengthen its unity, and resume its leading position in African sporting competitions" and planned to send 117 athletes to compete in the games, and enter 11 events. In the event, 86 qualified for entry, 34 men and 52 women.

Competitors included Kitenge Fibel who competed in both the Men's 200 and 400 metres and Kayembe Tshiaba who entered the Men's shot put. The women's football team was a last minute replacement for Ghana, who pulled out of the tournament. The team won their first match against Algeria on 4 October, but subsequently were eliminated in the qualifying stage. The women's team entered in Group B of the handball tournament, while the women's national team entered the basketball competition optimistically of a medal after coming second in 1999.

Medal summary
Democratic Republic of the Congo won two medals, a silver and a bronze medal, and was ranked twenty-eighth in the final medal table.

Medal table

List of Medalists

Silver Medal

See also
 Democratic Republic of the Congo at the African Games

References

2003 in the Democratic Republic of the Congo sport
Nations at the 2003 All-Africa Games
2003